Ryan Weisenberg (born January 21, 1975) is an American basketball coach who was the head coach of the Pepperdine Waves women's basketball team.

Weisenberg attended St. Francis High School, a Catholic high school in La Cañada Flintridge, California, where he lettered in basketball, football, and baseball. Weisenberg attended Azusa Pacific University, receiving a master in education, and attended Cal Poly San Luis Obispo, receiving a Bachelor of Science. Weisenberg began his coaching career in 1995 at Mission Prep High School. Two years later, he spent some time as an assistant coach, video scout, and basketball camp director at Cal Poly, San Luis Obispo. He spent five years as head coach for South Pasadena High School's boy's varsity basketball. After five years at South Pasadena High School, Weisenberg was hired as an assistant coach for the Los Angeles Sparks under coach Michael Cooper. After Cooper resigned in 2004, Weisenberg and Karleen Thompson were co-head coaches before leaving the Sparks. Then, Weisenberg worked for the Los Angeles Lakers as an assistant video coordinator and player scout. Weisenberg taught world history at Mater Dei High School in Santa Ana and was the varsity girls head basketball coach. Ryan also taught part-time 6th grade history at St. Mark's Lutheran School. This school is located in Hacienda Heights, which is about 45 minutes' drive locally from Anaheim. Additionally, he is the former assistant coach for the Houston Comets.

On January 6, 2010, Weisenberg was confirmed as the new Manawatu Jets coach. The team are based in Palmerston North, New Zealand and play in the NBL. He coached the Jets for 3 seasons before departing the team in February 2013.

Weisenberg is married to Lyndsey Hache.

References

External links
Pepperdine bio
WNBA Profile
Profile at Eurobasket.com

1975 births
Living people
American expatriate basketball people in New Zealand
American women's basketball coaches
Azusa Pacific University alumni
California Polytechnic State University alumni
High school basketball coaches in the United States
Houston Comets coaches
Los Angeles Sparks coaches
Pepperdine Waves women's basketball coaches